The 42nd Guldbagge Awards ceremony, presented by the Swedish Film Institute, honored the best Swedish films of 2006, and took place on 22 January 2007. Kidz in da Hood directed by Ylva Gustavsson and Catti Edfeldt was presented with the award for Best Film.

Winner and nominees

Awards

See also
 79th Academy Awards
 64th Golden Globe Awards
 60th British Academy Film Awards
 13th Screen Actors Guild Awards
 12th Critics' Choice Awards
 27th Golden Raspberry Awards

References

External links
Official website
Guldbaggen on Facebook
Guldbaggen on Twitter

2007 in Sweden
2006 film awards
Guldbagge Awards ceremonies
2000s in Stockholm
January 2007 events in Europe